The 1965 Hofstra Flying Dutchmen football team was an American football team that represented Hofstra University during the 1965 NCAA College Division football season. Hofstra finished second in the Middle Atlantic Conference, University Division.

In their 16th year under head coach Howard "Howdy" Myers Jr., the Flying Dutchmen compiled an 8–2 record, and outscored opponents 293 to 187. Henry Levin and Bill Starr were the team captains. 

With a 4–1 conference record, Hofstra narrowly missed the MAC University Division championship, finishing half a game behind Bucknell (5–1).

The Flying Dutchmen played their home games at Hofstra Stadium on the university's Hempstead campus on Long Island, New York.

Schedule

References

Hofstra
Hofstra Pride football seasons
Hofstra Flying Dutchmen football